During the Parade of Nations within the Beijing 2022 Winter Olympics opening ceremony on February 4, athletes and officials from each participating country marched in the Beijing National Stadium preceded by their flag and placard bearer bearing the respective country's name. Each flag bearer was chosen either by the nation's National Olympic Committee or by the team of athletes themselves.

Parade order
Athletes entered the stadium in an order dictated by the Olympic tradition. As the originator of the Olympics, the Greek team entered first. 

Countries marched in order of the Chinese language. The collation method used was based on the names as written in Simplified Chinese characters and is similar to that used in Chinese dictionaries. The names were sorted by the number of strokes in the first character of the name, then by the stroke order of the character (in the order 橫竖撇捺折, c.f. Wubi method), then the number of strokes and stroke order of the second character, then next character and so on.  For example, this placed San Marino in 28th position, just ahead of Kyrgyzstan because the initial character for "San Marino" is written in 5 strokes, while that for "Kyrgyzstan" is written in 6 strokes.

The country that will host the next Winter Olympics, Italy, marched before the host nation China entered, instead of entering between New Zealand and Serbia, according to the Chinese collation order.

As part of its doping penalty, Russia competes under the acronym "ROC" and the flag of the Russian Olympic Committee, and the name of the committee in full cannot be used to refer to the delegation.

Announcers in the stadium read off the names of the marching nations in Mandarin Chinese (the official language of the host country), English and French (the official languages of the Olympics) with music accompanying the athletes as they marched into the stadium.

According to the current version of the Olympic Charter, each nation had the option of having two flag bearers (a man and a woman) in an effort to promote gender equality.

List
The following is a list of each country's flag bearer. The list is sorted by the sequence that each nation appeared in the Parade of Nations. The names are given in their official designations by the IOC, and the Chinese names follow their official designations by the Beijing Organizing Committee for the 2022 Olympic and Paralympic Winter Games.

Notes

References

Parade of Nations
Lists of Olympic flag bearers
Parades in China